or  is a book written by the Flemish writer and painter Karel van Mander first published in 1604 in Haarlem in the Dutch Republic, where van Mander resided. The book is written in 17th-century Dutch and its title is commonly translated into English as 'The Book of Painters' or 'The Book of (or on) Painting' and sometimes as 'The Book on Picturing'.  consists of six parts and is considered one of the principal sources on the history of art and art theory in the 15th and 16th century Low Countries. The book was very well received and sold well. Karel van Mander died two years after its publication. A second posthumous edition, which included a brief, anonymous biography of van Mander was published in 1618. This second edition was translated by Hessel Miedema into English and published in 1994-1997 together with a facsimile of the original and five volumes of notes on the text.

Summary
 is divided into six parts that have separate title pages and are indexed. The parts are:

 The foundations of the noble and free art of painting
 Lives of the illustrious ancient painters including Egyptians, Greek and Romans
 Lives of the modern or contemporary illustrious Italian painters
 Lives of the illustrious Netherlandish and German painters
 Commentary on the Metamorphoses of Publius Ovidius Nasso
 Depiction of figures

Historiographic background
The history of early Netherlandish painting was first described by the Italian Lodovico Guicciardini in his  (1567; The Description of the Low Countries).
That tradition took little account of the geographic topology of the Low countries and the van Eyck brothers were considered the fathers of Netherlandish painting concentrated in Bruges. Karel van Mander intended to correct this misconception by listing all the famous early Netherlandish painters. He encountered many difficulties in obtaining accurate information, due to the political and religious unrest at the time.

Karel van Mander digresses only rarely from the format: starting per painter with an overview of the childhood years and a list of teachers, followed by some career information and concluding with a list of notable works. The second edition includes a biography of van Mander himself that Miedema believes was written by his brother, who may have been with him on his deathbed. Other candidates have been proposed as authors of the biography. Recently his son Karel van Mander the Younger was identified as a possible author. His son would have relied on biographical information that Karel van Mander had written himself as well as on his own recollections and notes. The information in the biographical sketch is not entirely reliable but is still regarded as the best source of information on van Mander's life.

Van Mander was writing in a country where Calvinists were powerful and religious art was regarded with suspicion. The market for religious subjects was quickly replaced in favor of genre scenes and historical allegories. It became fashionable to choose politically correct subjects such as stories too old to be offensive to either Protestants or Catholics. The city of Haarlem needed to reinvent itself after losing its attraction as a pilgrimage site for St. Bavo. Its leaders commissioned paintings depicting the city's glorious past, such as in the story of the crusade against Damietta, which was the basis for the Coat of arms of Haarlem. Artists and writers helped update the local source of inspiration for art. Van Mander contributed to this effort by supplying a list of biographies of ancient painters in Lives of Ancient Egyptian, Greek and Roman painters and his commentaries on Ovid's Metamorphoses and the depiction of figures.

The six parts of the

The foundations of the noble and free art of painting
The book begins with a book on the "foundation" of the art of paintings. This introductory book has fourteen chapters on art theory listing such subjects as landscapes, animals, drapery, and arrangements of subjects.

Lives of the illustrious ancient painters including Egyptians, Greek and Roman
s biographies of ancient painters is almost entirely based on Pliny's Naturalis Historia and offers no new material.

Van Mander's list of ancient Greek painters 

 Agatharchus
 Androcydes
 Antiphilus
 Apelles
 Apollodorus
 Aristides of Thebes
 Cimon of Cleonae
 Echion
 Euphranor
 Eupompus
 Melanthius

 Nicomachus of Thebes
 Pamphilus of Amphipolis
 Panaenus
 Parrhasius
 Pausias
 Polyeidos 
 Polygnotus
 Protogenes
 Theon of Samos
 Timarete 
 Timomachus
 Zeuxis

Lives of the modern or contemporary illustrious Italian painters
The  had been published half a century earlier. For this reason he only translated about half of Vasari's biographical sketches, and he added Italian artists from his years in Italy, such as Tintoretto who became known after Vasari's work was published. Van Mander also purposefully editorialized Vasari's biographies by reinterpreting some of Vasari's material and by adding to Vasari's text with a view to updating it. What follows is a list of Vasari sketches that van Mander translated and included in his work:

 Cimabue
 Andrea Tafi
 Gaddo Gaddi
 Margaritone
 Giotto, with Puccio Capanna
 Stefano di Giovanni and Ugolino di Nerio
 Pietro Lorenzetti (Pietro Laurati)
 Buonamico Buffalmacco
 Ambrogio Lorenzetti (Ambruogio Laurati)
 Pietro Cavallini
 Simone Martini with Lippo Memmi
 Taddeo Gaddi
 Andrea Orcagna (Andrea di Cione)
 Tommaso Fiorentino
 Lippo
 Masaccio
 Leon Battista Alberti
 Antonello da Messina
 Domenico Ghirlandaio
 Antonio del Pollaiuolo
 Sandro Botticelli
 Andrea del Verrocchio
 Andrea Mantegna
 Filippino Lippi
 Francesco Francia
 Pietro Perugino
 Luca Signorelli
 Leonardo da Vinci
 Giorgione da Castelfranco
 Antonio da Correggio
 Raffaellino del Garbo
 Baldassare Peruzzi
 Pellegrino da Modena (Pellegrino Aretusi)
 Andrea del Sarto

 Giovanni Antonio Licino
 Polidoro da Caravaggio and Maturino da Firenze (Maturino Fiorentino)
 Bartolommeo Ramenghi (Bartolomeo Da Bagnacavallo)
 Franciabigio
 Francesco Mazzola
 Jacopo Palma (Il Palma)
 Lorenzo Lotto
 Giulio Romano
 Sebastiano del Piombo (Sebastiano Viniziano)
 Perino Del Vaga
 Giovann'Antonio Lappoli
 Baccio Bandinelli
 Jacopo da Pontormo
 Giovanni da Udine
 Francesco Rustichi
 Francesco detto de' Salviati
 Daniello Ricciarelli da Volterra
 Taddeo Zucchero
 Michelangelo Buonarroti (Michelangelo)
 Francesco Primaticcio
 Tiziano da Cadore (Titian)
 Tintoretto
 Paulo Caliary, student of Giovanni Francesco Caroto
 Jacopo Bassano
 Giorgio Vasari
 Frederick Zucchero
 Frederick Barozio
 Lorenzo Lotto
 Giuseppe Cesari
 Other Italian painters worthy of mention; Annibale Carracci (Caratz), Michael Agnolo van Caravaggio
 List of painters he knew during his time in Italy, and afterwards; Girolamo Siciolante da Sermoneta, Antonio Tempesta, Ventura Salimbeni, Marco Pino, Andrea Boscoli

Lives of the illustrious Netherlandish and German painters
Van Mander is less known for his translated work on Italian art than he is for his biographical sketches of Netherlandish painters. What follows is the list of already famous painters from the low countries discussed in the book.

 Jan and Hubert van Eyck 
 Rogier van Brugghe 
 Hugo van der Goes 
 Albert van Ouwater and Albert Simonsz 
 Geertgen tot Sint Jans 
 Dirk Bouts 
 Rogier van der Weyden 
 Jacob Cornelisz van Oostsanen 
 Albrecht Dürer 
 Cornelis Engelbrechtsz 
 Bernard van Orley 
 Lucas van Leyden 
 Ian den Hollander 
 Quentin Matsys 
 Hieronymus Bosch 
 Cornelis Cornelisz Kunst 
 Lucas Cornelisz de Kock 
 Jan Joest van Calcar 
 Pieter van Aelst
 Joachim Patinir
 Herri met de Bles
 Lucas Gassel van Helmont
 Lambert Lombard
 Hans Holbein the Younger
 Jan Cornelisz Vermeyen
 Jan Mabuse
 Augustijn Ioorisz
 Joos van Cleve
 Aldegraef
 Swart Jan
 Frans Minnebroer with Frans Verbeeck, Vincent Geldersman, Hans Hoogenbergh, Frans Crabbe, Claes Roegier, Hans Kaynoot den dooven, Cornelis Enghelrams, Marcus Willems, and Iaques de Poindre, and Gregorius Beerings
 Jan Mostaert
 Adriaen de Weerdt

 Hendrick and Marten van Cleef
 Anthonis Mor
 Jacob de Backer
 Matthys Cock and Hieronymus Cock
 Willem Key
 Pieter Brueghel the Elder
 Jan van Scorel
 Aertgen van Leyden
 Joachim Beuckelaer
 Frans Floris
 Pieter Aertsen
 Maarten van Heemskerck
 Richard Aertsz
 Hubert Goltz
 Pieter Vlerick van Cortrijck and Carel van Yper
 Anthonie van Montfoort
 Lucas de Heere
 Jacques Grimmaer
 Cornelis Molenaer
 Pieter Balten
 Joos van Liere
 Pieter Pourbus and Frans Pourbus the Elder with Frans Pourbus the younger
 Marcus Gheeraerts the Elder
 Christoffel Swarts
 Michael Coxcie
 Dirck Barendsz
 Lucas and Marten van Valckenborgh
 Hans Bol
 Frans and Gillis Mostart with Jan Mandijn
 Marinus van Reymerswaele
 Hendrik van Steenwijk I
 Bernaert de Rijcke 
 Gielis Coignet 
 Joris Hoefnagel
 Aert Mijtens
 Joos van Winghen
 Marten de Vos

Van Mander also described contemporary painters who he felt were of note. The following is a list of all of these painters.

 Hans Vredeman de Vries
 Stradanus
 Gillis van Coninxloo
 Bartholomeus Spranger
 Cornelis Ketel
 Gualdrop Gortzius
 Michiel Jansz van Mierevelt
 Hendrick Goltzius
 Hendrick Cornelisz Vroom
 Jan Soens
 Hans von Aachen
 Peter Candid
 Paul Bril and Matthijs Bril
 Cornelis van Haarlem, with Gerrit Pietersz Sweelink
 Jacob de Gheyn II
 Otto van Veen, Jan Snellinck, Tobias Verhaecht, Adam van Noort, Hendrick van Balen, Sebastian Vrancx, Joos de Momper
 Hans Rottenhammer, Hans Donauer, Adam Elsheimer, Lodewijk Toeput

 Joachim Wtewael
 Abraham Bloemaert
 Pieter Cornelisz van Rijck
 Francesco Badens
 David Vinckboons
 Cornelis Floris de Vriendt, Paulus Moreelse, Michael Mierevelt, Frans de Grebber, Jacob Savery, Cornelis Claesz van Wieringen, Barend and Paulus van Someren, Cornelis van der Voort, Everard Crynsz van der Maes, Jan Antonisz. van Ravesteyn, Aart Jansz Druyvesteyn, Jacques de Mosscher, Thonis Ariaensz (Alkmaar), Claes Jacobsz van der Heck (Alkmaar), Pieter Gerritsz Montfoort (Delft), Pieter Diericksen Cluyt (Delft)
 Joan Ariaensz van Leiden, and Hubert Tons van Rotterdam

Commentary on the Metamorphoses of Publius Ovidius Nasso
Van Mander had received a humanist training and had earlier published a translation of Ovid's Metamorphoses. In the  he provided a commentary on the Metamorphoses. Van Mander accepted the Renaissance view that there was no conflict between classical mythology and Old Testament history and that mythology was able to convey evangelical truths and lessons. For instance, the myth of the Titans assaulting Jupiter's throne could be interpreted as an illustration of the Christian dictum that pride is the cause of all evil.

This part was well-received and was later sold as a separate book.

Depiction of figures
The final book about the depiction of figures contains a list of various animals, birds and other objects that can have meaning for the painter to include in his arrangement. This book includes some pagan rituals for use in historical allegories. Included before the index to the Metamorphoses, it is meant as an extra guide for that book.

The indexes
Because the pages are numbered only on the right-hand page, the indexes have an addendum to the page number to indicate the front (recto) or back (verso) of the "folio" to be able to locate text more efficiently. Looking up painters remains difficult because the indexes use first names rather than last names, since the last names in use by the painters themselves were not consistent in all regions where the painters were active. Many painters were better known by their nicknames than their given names. For this reason, the spelling of the names used in the text does not always match the names in the indexes.

Legacy

The  introduced Dutch and Flemish artists to Italian art and encouraged them to travel to Italy.

The  was very influential on art writing in the seventeenth and eighteenth centuries.

It has historically been and still is the most important book for historians looking for details on (early) Netherlandish painters. This book is still the most-cited primary source in biographical accounts of the lives of many artists he included. Of most interest to historians is his criticism of the work of these artists, especially when he describes the painting style, use of color, location and owner of the paintings, thus becoming a valuable source for art provenance.

The  is included in the Basic Library of the dbnl (Canon of Dutch Literature), which contains what its compilers believe to be the 1,000 most important works in Dutch literature from the Middle Ages to today.

Translation
The Lives of the illustrious Netherlandish and German painters was translated into modern Dutch and English by Miedema and published in the 1990s. In his attempt to provide a systematic overview of the Lives, Miedema includes a long list of the sources on which Karel van Mander relied as he did for his own modern translation, and includes prints, photos of paintings, sculpture, architecture and stained glass window cartoons to illustrate the text. He also publishes new archival evidence.

References

Further reading
 The 1604 edition of Het Schilder-Boeck on DBNL (text and facsimile versions)
 Facsimile of the 1604 edition of Het Schilder-Boeck at Google books

1604 books
Dutch biographical dictionaries
Art history books
Case studies
Dutch non-fiction books
Mander
Biographies about artists
17th-century Dutch books
Art of the Dutch Golden Age